Not to be confounded with De Pauw.

De Fauw or Defauw is a Belgian surname.

It has many variants. It derives from Old French fou, fau, "beech", itself from Latin fagus, or, like the variants Defau and Defaut, it indicates origin from Faux (Faulx), from Faux in Court-Saint-Étienne, Wallonia, or Faulx-les-Tombes, near Namur, also in Wallonia, or from Les Fawes, Liège. The etymology of these toponyms is either still from Latin fagus via Old French, or from Germanic *falisa, "cliff".

People by first name

B
 Brad DeFauw, American former professional ice hockey winger

D
 Davy De fauw, Belgian footballer
 Désiré Defauw, Belgian conductor and violinist
 Dimitri De Fauw, Belgian cyclist
 Dirk De fauw, Belgian politician

K
 Ken De Fauw, Belgian cyclist

R
 Rita Defauw, Belgian rower

References

Surnames of Belgian origin
Toponymic surnames